The 1997 Caribbean Football Union Club Championship was an international club football competition held in the Caribbean to determine the region's qualifiers to the CONCACAF Champions' Cup. 
The winners United Petrotrin advanced to CONCACAF Champions' Cup 1997.

Group 1
played in Pointe-à-Pierre, Trinidad and Tobago

Group 2
played in Montego Bay, Jamaica

match had finished 2-3 but was awarded 2-0 as Franciscain used two ineligible players

Qualifying playoff

United Petrotrin advance to CONCACAF Champions' Cup 1997

Top scorers

1997
1